Zalomes is a genus of skippers in the family Hesperiidae.

Species
Recognised species in the genus Zalomes include:
 Zalomes biforis (Weymer, 1890)

Former species
Zalomes colobus Bell, 1947 - synonymized with Hesperia biforis Weymer, 1890

References

External links
Natural History Museum Lepidoptera genus database

Hesperiinae
Hesperiidae genera